WLYQ is a classic country formatted broadcast radio station licensed to Parkersburg, West Virginia, serving the Mid-Ohio Valley. WLYQ is owned and operated by Burbach Broadcasting Company.

History
On February 1, 2018, WADC changed their format from adult standards to classic country, branded as "Willie 1050" under new WLYQ calls.

References

External links
WLYQ Willie 1050 Online

1954 establishments in West Virginia
Classic country radio stations in the United States
Radio stations established in 1954
LYQ